Fred Lowery (2 November 1909 – 11 December 1984) was a blind professional whistler who recorded a No. 9 Billboard chart hit version of "The High and the Mighty" with conductor and arranger LeRoy Holmes. Lowery whistled with Horace Heidt and Vincent Lopez in the 1930s and 40s. His 'Silent Night' and 'William Tell Overture' demonstrate the difference between everyday whistling and puccalo.

Lowery was born in Palestine in Anderson County in east Texas and lost his eyesight at the age of two after being stricken with scarlet fever. With an artificial right eye and limited vision in the left, Fred Lowery was legally blind – not totally blind. From the age of eight he was educated at the Texas School for the Blind and Visually Impaired. In 1929, when he was attending school, he met a bird imitator. "He encouraged me," he recalled, "and I began to discover there was more to whistling than bird calls."  After a series of minor successes, including a radio show on WFAA in Dallas, and a -year engagement with the Vincent Lopez orchestra in New York, he was heard by Horace Heidt. Heidt gave Lowery his chance for national recognition as a featured part of his show.  In 1945, Lowery struck out on his own. His 1939 version of the song Indian Love Call sold over 2 million copies. During his career, he performed at Carnegie Hall and at the White House.

Discography
William Tell Overture – Columbia 35234 (WB 24992) 10" 78 (1939)

Listen to the Mocking Bird – Columbia 35234 (WB 24940) 10" 78 (1939)

Whistling For You – Columbia C-148 10" 78 (1947)

Whistling For You – Columbia CL 6091 10" LP (1950)

Walking Along Kicking the Leaves, Fred Lowery whistling with orchestra directed by Own Bradley – Decca DL 8476 LP Mono (1957)

Whistle a Happy Tune – Decca DL 8995 LP Mono (1960)

Fred Lowery Sings for the Birds – Lowery ED1001 LP Mono

There'll Be Whistling and Singing in Heaven – Gra-Low GR-7100 LP Mono

A Family Christmas – Gra-Low GR-7101 LP Mono

Fred Lowery Whistles Your Gospel Favorites – Word WST-8326 LP Stereo (1967)

Abide With Me – Word WST-8456 LP Stereo (1968)

Precious Memories – Word WST-8516 LP Stereo (1971)

It is Well with My Soul – Word WST-8563 LP Stereo (1972)

References

1909 births
1984 deaths
Whistlers
Blind musicians
People from Palestine, Texas
Musicians from Texas
20th-century American musicians